Prof. Dr. Zafer İlken is a Turkish educator, university administrator and the author/co-author of numerous scientific papers, who has been serving (since 2006) as the third rector of the İzmir Institute of Technology, founded in 1992.

Zafer İlken received his degrees in mechanical engineering from Ankara's Middle East Technical University (B.Sc., 1982) and İzmir's Dokuz Eylül University (M.Sc., 1987 and Ph.D., 1990). Among his research writings, which have been published in a number of scientific journals, have been:

References

External links
 Zafer İlken, Professor, İYTE Department of Mechanical Engineering 

Turkish educators
Academic staff of the İzmir Institute of Technology
People from İzmir
Living people
1960 births
Place of birth missing (living people)
Rectors of İzmir Institute of Technology
Middle East Technical University alumni
Dokuz Eylül University alumni